Rinka Duijndam (born 6 August 1997) is a Dutch female handballer who plays as a goalkeeper for Sola HK and the Dutch national team.

She represented the Netherlands at the 2019 World Women's Handball Championship.

Achievements
Norwegian Cup
 Silver: 2022/2023

References

External links

1997 births
Living people
People from Wateringen
Dutch female handball players
Expatriate handball players
Dutch expatriate sportspeople in Germany
Handball players at the 2020 Summer Olympics
Sportspeople from South Holland
21st-century Dutch women